The Cârligați is a right tributary of the river Trebeș in Romania. It flows into the Trebeș near Mărgineni.

References

Rivers of Romania
Rivers of Bacău County